The Church of the Blessed Hope (or Church of God of the Abrahamic Faith) is a small first-day Adventist Christian body. The churches have common roots with the Christadelphians and the Church of God General Conference (Abrahamic Faith).

Background
Benjamin Wilson spent his early life in Halifax, England. Benjamin, with his brothers, Joseph, John, and James, questioned the teachings of their local Baptist church and "became convinced that the promises to Abraham were central to salvation". Benjamin and James moved their families to Geneva, Illinois in 1844. Brothers John and Joseph came to Geneva around 1849. Together they started a church in Geneva. Because of adopting a stance against military service, there was a need to adopt an "official" name during the Civil War. The name "Church of God of the Abrahamic Faith", suggested by Benjamin Wilson, was chosen. The work of the Wilsons led to a number of congregations from Ohio to California (where Benjamin later moved), but no central organization.

John Thomas, founder of the Christadelphians, was also a British emigrant who had been associated with the Campbellite movement in Illinois. Thomas and Wilson first corresponded by letter from 1846-1856 then met and were in active fellowship from 1856-1862. However, in 1863 a disagreement between the two men concerning the judgment seat and the resurrection caused the groups associated with them to separate, and the rift was confirmed when the two groups registered (for the purposes of conscientious objection in the American Civil War) with different names in 1865.

The Church of the Blessed Hope began as a local congregation in Cleveland, Ohio. It was organized on October 4, 1863. Mark Allen, a missionary of the Church of God Abrahamic Faith movement from Woburn, Massachusetts, led fourteen Ohioans in founding this body. Congregations were soon afterward established in Salem and Unionville, and these congregations incorporated themselves as the Church of the Blessed Hope in 1888. All these congregations still exist, although the Cleveland body has moved to Chesterland. The leader of the Cleveland congregation from 1922–1927 was a Christadelphian.

The Church of the Blessed Hope and the Church of God of the Abrahamic Faith were different in name, but part of the same movement. By the early 20th century, the movement had grown to over 200 congregations in about a dozen states. They were only a loose fellowship of churches. Some ties were maintained by state conferences and a periodical, The Restitution.

When Benjamin Wilson retired in 1869 he left his The Gospel Banner to be merged with his nephew Thomas Wilson's Herald of the Coming Kingdom and Bible Instructor, which was renamed in The Restitution in 1871 and published by Thomas Wilson and W.D. St. Clair in Chicago. In 1911 the five man Ministerial Association objected to the next editor of The Restitution, A. R. Underwood of Plymouth Indiana, leading to a severing of fellowship of the churches.

The majority followed those opposed to Underwood, led by L. E. Connor, and they added two doctrines to their statement of faith - universal resurrection and open communion. Later, they also added the belief in a personal devil. The majority regrouped in 1921 and organized the Church of God (General Conference) (CoGGC) publishing a new magazine The Restitution Herald, published in Oregon, Illinois.

Five congregations (three in Ohio and one each in Kentucky and Indiana) rejected these doctrinal additions and stood for the old Geneva Statement of Faith, now publishing The Restitution from Cleveland, Ohio. The minority congregations maintained ties, and in 1966 four of the then six churches adopted a uniform doctrinal statement. In 1976 these six churches (informally known as CGAF) began to gather for an annual gathering, which is now held each year in August at various colleges in Ohio.

Faith and practice
The Church of the Blessed Hope (CGAF) rejects the doctrine of the Trinity; recognizes the Bible as God's revealed word; teaches that salvation is obtained through hearing, believing, confessing, and obeying the gospel; and expects the premillennial return and reign of Jesus, in which the righteous and the unjust will be raised, but that those who have not heard the gospel will not be raised from the dead. Valid baptism is performed through the immersion of believers in water. Christ's command to partake the bread and the cup (communion) is observed weekly.

They reject the doctrines which the larger CoGGC grouping accepted in 1921, namely a literal devil, universal resurrection, and open communion. Additionally CGAF members do not serve in war as combatants, although some congregations permit members to serve in humanitarian positions.

Status
In 2003, the Church of the Blessed Hope (CGAF) had eight congregations with about 400 members. The three Ohio congregations use the name Church of the Blessed Hope and the others do not.

These CGAF churches are theologically much closer to the Christadelphians than they are to the Church of God General Conference (CoGGC), and have made moves in recent years to strengthen their ties. Most of the churches use the Christadelphian hymnal and Sunday School literature. Several of the CGAF churches, while having their own local statement of faith have also recognised the most common Christadelphian statement of the faith (BASF), in much the same way as many Christadelphian assemblies in Britain have their own local statements but employ the most common statement for wider purposes.

It is a common practice for members of the Church of the Blessed Hope to seek out Christadelphian ecclesias when they move to areas where there is not a Church of the Blessed Hope. They are generally accepted into the Christadelphian ecclesia, and become active members of the Christadelphian community. Likewise, the Church of the Blessed Hope will accept a Christadelphian into fellowship.

The CGAF annual Gathering, currently held at Denison, Ohio, has played an important role in reintroducing CGAF to Christadelphians and Christadelphians to CGAF. The Gathering receives a large contingent of both Unamended Christadelphians and Amended Christadelphians each year, and likewise many CGAF members attend Christadelphian events such as the annual Great Lakes Christadelphian Bible School. CGAF members have been invited to submit both articles, letters and event announcements in the Christadelphian Tidings, and likewise Christadelphians in the Abrahamic Faith Beacon. CGAF members cooperate with Christadelphian mission and charity organisations overseas. At the same time, common participation by CGAF and Christadelphian members on discussion forums has helped to make many Christadelphians, even outside North America, aware of the common beliefs shared with CGAF, and the differences with Church of God General Conference.

See also
Nontrinitarianism
Non-Trinitarian churches

Footnotes

References

External links
Chesterland Church of God of the Abrahamic Faith
Niles Church of God of the Abrahamic Faith
Perryville Church of God of the Abrahamic Faith
Miami COGAF Homepage
The Church of God of the Abrahamic Faith on a Christadelphian site

Adventism
Christian denominations established in the 19th century
Christian denominations in the United States
Christian groups with annihilationist beliefs
Nontrinitarian denominations
Religious organizations established in 1863
Restorationism (Christianity)